Peter Parker (born 2 June 1954) is a British biographer, historian, journalist and editor. He was elected a Fellow of the Royal Society of Literature in 1997.

Life and career

Education 

Parker was born to Edward Parker and Patricia Sturridge on 2 June 1954 in Herefordshire in the West Midlands of England. He attended the Downs Malvern in Colwall and Canford School in Dorset, and read English literature at University College London. He began a career in literary journalism while working in the Design Centre's bookshop in the 1980s, contributing regular book reviews to Gay News and London Magazine. He published a number of short stories in London Magazine, Fiction magazine, Critical Quarterly and three PEN/Arts Council anthologies.

Books 
Parker subsequently turned to writing non-fiction, and his first book, The Old Lie: The Great War and the Public-School Ethos was published by Constable in 1987. A paperback edition, with a new introduction, was published by Bloomsbury in 2007.

Parker's second book Ackerley: The Life of J. R. Ackerley was published by Constable in the UK in 1989 and by Farrar, Straus and Giroux in America.

He edited (and wrote much of) two literary encyclopaedias: A Reader's Guide to the Twentieth-Century Novel published in the UK by Fourth Estate and Helicon in 1994 and in America by Oxford University Press in 1995, and A Reader's Guide to Twentieth-Century Writers published in the UK by Fourth Estate and Helicon in 1995 and in America by Oxford University Press in 1996.

Parker then wrote the "definitive" biography of Christopher Isherwood which took him 12 years to finish; he said, "I was married to Christopher Isherwood for 12 years and to J. R. Ackerley I think only for four." The book was published in 2004, on the centenary of Isherwood's birth, by Pan Macmillan in the UK under the title Isherwood and by Random House in America under the title Isherwood: A Life Revealed. David Thomson, in The New Republic described it as, "Immense and magnificent … A Life Revealed is a modest subtitle for such a daunting process of reconstruction and re-appraisal."

The Last Veteran: Harry Patch and the Legacy of War was published by Fourth Estate on Armistice Day in 2009. Simon Heffer in The Daily Telegraph wrote, "A fine work of research and of history. Parker tells the story of how the War came to an end and how the aftermath was coped with."

Parker's Housman Country: Into the Heart of England, is cultural history of A Shropshire Lad, was published by Little, Brown in 2016. It was among the Financial Times, The Spectators, the Evening Standards and The Sunday Times Best Books of 2016. The book was published in the US in 2017 by Farrar, Straus and Giroux and was a New York Times Book Review Editor's Choice and nominated for the 2017 PEN/Bograd Weld Prize for Biography.

Parker wrote a discursive account of the history and origins of plant names in his book A Little Book of Latin for Gardeners published by Little, Brown in 2018.

Journalism 
Parker was an associate editor of the Oxford Dictionary of National Biography (2004) and remains an advisory editor for the regular updates to the project.

Among the books to which Parker has contributed are Scribner's British Writers (on L. P. Hartley, 2002), the seventh edition of The Oxford Companion to English Literature (2009), Fifty Gay and Lesbian Books Everybody Must Read (2009) and Britten's Century, published in 2013 to mark the centenary of the composer Benjamin Britten. His edition of G. F. Green's 1952 novel In the Making was published as a Penguin Modern Classic in 2012, and in 2016 he wrote an introduction to the Slightly Foxed edition of Diana Petre's 1975 memoir The Secret Orchard of Roger Ackerley. A full-length animated feature film of J. R. Ackerley's book My Dog Tulip, for which he collaborated on the script and acted as advisor to the producers, was released in 2010.

Parker was a member of the executive committee of English PEN from 1993 to 1997 and a trustee of the PEN Literary Foundation, acting as chair from 1999 to 2000. He was on the committee of the London Library from 1999 to 2002, subsequently becoming a trustee (2004–07); chair of the Royal Horticultural Society's Lindley Library Advisory Committee (2009–2013); and vice-chair of the Council of the Royal Society of Literature (2008–14). From 2014 until 2017 he  was a visiting fellow in the School of Arts at the University of Northampton.

Since 1979 Parker has been a frequent contributor of reviews and features to numerous newspapers and magazines, including The Listener, The Independent, The Daily Telegraph, The Sunday Times, The Spectator, The Times Literary Supplement, the New Statesman, The Oldie, Slightly Foxed, Apollo and the gardening quarterly Hortus. He was on the editorial board of the London Library Magazine (2008–2019) while he continues to serve on the editorial board of RIBA's A Magazine. Since 1990 he has been one of the judges of the annual PEN Ackerley Prize for literary autobiography, becoming chair in 2007, and he was for several years one of the judges of the Encore Award for a second novel.

References

External links 

Bloomsbury
 Observer review: Isherwood by Peter Parker
 Review: Isherwood by Peter Parker
 Christopher and his kind
 Isherwood’s fine memorial
 Review: Isherwood by Peter Parker
 ISHERWOOD by Peter Parker | Kirkus Reviews
 I am a cactus
 Isherwood by Peter Parker
 Housman Country: Into the Heart of England by Peter Parker – review
 England’s Poet of Melancholy, and Why He Never Went Out of Print
 On the Trail of ‘A Shropshire Lad’
 The Observer as Hero
 I, Me, Mine
 The Last Veterans: Harry Patch and the Legacy of War by Peter Parker: review
 Harry Patch, the Last Veteran and the Unknown Warrior
 Housman Country: Into the Heart of England by Peter Parker review – the inverse of roast-beef heartiness

English biographers
20th-century English historians
21st-century English historians
1954 births
Living people
People from Herefordshire
People educated at Canford School
Alumni of University College London
Fellows of the Royal Society of Literature